John Bailey (died 1436) was the member of Parliament for Calne in the parliament of 1420 and for Cricklade in the parliament of 1427.

References 

Members of the Parliament of England (pre-1707) for Cricklade
Year of birth unknown
1436 deaths
Members of Parliament for Calne
English MPs 1427